Cabo Ledo is a commune in the municipality of Quicama, Luanda Province, Angola.

See also 

 Communes of Angola

References 

Populated places in Luanda Province